Kumrat is a valley in the Upper Dir District of Khyber Pakhtunkhwa province of Pakistan. Kumrat Valley is located about 45 minutes away from the town of Thal on the banks of the Panjkora River, and is among the most popular tourist spots in Khyber Pakhtunkhwa.

Every summer season, around a million tourists from different areas of the country visit Kumrat Valley for its greenery and cool weather. Around Eid al-Fitr holidays, around 2,000 vehicles enter the region on a daily basis. It can only be accessed using 4x4 vehicles, as the road leading to it is unmetalled.

Features 
Kumrat is covered with green pastures, snow clad mountains, the river Panjkora, foggy mounds and forests are attractions of the region, which serve as habitats for variety of flora and fauna. It is located in the Upper Dir Kohistan region at the back side of which Swat Kohistan area of Gabral is located.

Another feature of Kumrat Valley is its towering Deodar forest trees located on level ground adjacent the Panjkora river. At several places, the Panjkora River divides into channels, on the banks of which a few makeshift camping spots offer accommodation to tourists. There are several waterfalls there as well. Kala Chashma (Black Spring) is also located there.

Deforestation
Deodar forest is fast depleting in Dir Kohistan Valley and it continues unhindered as the locals claim that they have no other source of fuel for heating and cooking purposes in the harsh winter season. The people of Kohistan Valley had offered the government in the 2010s that they were ready stop cutting deodar trees if they were provided with a natural gas facility. However, the government did not pay any heed to their demand.

See also
 Kaghan Valley
 Ushirai Dara
 Laram Top
 Jahaz Banda

References

Upper Dir District
Tourism in Khyber Pakhtunkhwa
Tourism in Pakistan
Valleys of Khyber Pakhtunkhwa
Tourist attractions in Khyber Pakhtunkhwa